Adalbert Korponay (18 February 1966 – 23 April 2017) was a Soviet–Ukrainian football striker.

He had two older brothers Ivan and Tiberiy together with whom he used to play for FC Kremin Kremenchuk. He also played five games in 1990 for FC Metalist Kharkiv.

References

External links
 

1966 births
2017 deaths
Soviet footballers
Ukrainian footballers
FC Volyn Lutsk players
FC Metalurh Zaporizhzhia players
FC Kremin Kremenchuk players
FC Metalist Kharkiv players
Ukrainian Premier League players
Ukrainian First League players
Ukrainian Amateur Football Championship players
Association football forwards